The 1994 Hopman Cup was the sixth edition of the Hopman Cup that was held at the Burswood Entertainment Complex, in Perth, Western Australia. Jana Novotná and Petr Korda of the Czech Republic defeated Anke Huber and Bernd Karbacher of Germany in the final to win the title.

Teams

Seeds
 – Jana Novotná and 'Petr Korda (champions) – Mary Joe Fernandez and Ivan Lendl
 – Conchita Martínez and Emilio Sánchez
 – Nathalie Tauziat and Cédric Pioline
 – Nicole Provis and Wally Masur
 – Natalia Medvedeva and Andrei Medvedev
 – Manuela Maleeva-Fragniere and Jakob Hlasek
 – Amanda Coetzer and Marcos Ondruska

Unseeded
 - Judith Wiesner and Alex Antonitsch
 - Anke Huber and Bernd Karbacher (finalists)''
 - Miriam Oremans and Jan Siemerink
 - Catarina Lindqvist and Mikael Pernfors

Draw

Results

First Round

Switzerland vs. Netherlands

Australia vs. Sweden

Austria vs. Ukraine

Germany vs. South Africa

Quarterfinals

Czech Republic vs. Switzerland

Australia vs. France

Austria vs. Spain

Germany vs. United States

Semifinals

Czech Republic vs. Australia

Germany vs. Austria

Final

References

External links 

Hopman Cups by year
Hopman Cup